Jerry Houston Bell (born October 6, 1947) is a former Major League Baseball pitcher. Bell played for the Milwaukee Brewers for four seasons. He batted right and left and threw right-handed.

Bell attended Jesup High School and then Rhodes College where he was drafted by the Seattle Pilots, (now known as the Milwaukee Brewers) in the 2nd round of the 1969 draft.

External links

1947 births
Living people
Major League Baseball pitchers
Baseball players from Tennessee
Belmont Bruins baseball players
Rhodes Lynx baseball players
Milwaukee Brewers players
Evansville Triplets players
San Antonio Brewers players
Portland Beavers players
Clinton Pilots players
Sacramento Solons players
Raleigh-Durham Triangles players
Newark Co-Pilots players
Oklahoma City 89ers players
Salt Lake City Angels players